Tremex is a genus of woodwasp in the Siricidae family. It has 33 species with a holarctic distribution. The larvae feed on hardwoods.

Selected species

Tremex alchymista (Mocsary, 1886)
Tremex columba (Linnaeus, 1763)
Tremex fuscicornis (Fabricius, 1787)
Tremex magus (Fabricius, 1787)

References 

Siricidae